The America was a wooden schooner. Its shipwreck site is located off the coast of Carlton, Wisconsin in Lake Michigan.

Service history
The America was completed in Port Huron, Michigan in 1873. Primarily, the ship sailed on the lower areas of Lake Michigan. Its main cargo consisted of lumber and ice.

Sinking
On September 28, 1880, the America was en route to Escanaba, Michigan from Chicago, Illinois. The plan had been for it to pick up a load of iron ore that was to be sent to Michigan City, Indiana. That night, the America struck another vessel's scow line, causing catastrophic damage to the bow. The ship sank fast. A little over a week later, efforts to salvage the America were unsuccessful and the wreck was abandoned.

The shipwreck was found in 1977. Its wheel is on display at the Wisconsin Maritime Museum in Manitowoc, Wisconsin and its anchor is on display at the Rogers Street Fishing Village in Two Rivers, Wisconsin.

References

Shipwrecks on the National Register of Historic Places in Wisconsin
National Register of Historic Places in Kewaunee County, Wisconsin
Shipwrecks of the Wisconsin coast
Shipwrecks of Lake Michigan